Llangeinor Athletic Football Club are an association football club based in the village of Llangeinor near Bridgend, Wales. The club currently plays in both the South Wales Alliance League Division 2 and the Bridgend & District League in South Wales. Llangeinor have a history of football going back to before the Second World War, when football was played at Pandy Woods. The move to Llangeinor Park came after a brief spell playing on Llangeinor Common.

They currently play in South Wales Alliance League Division 2, Bridgend and District Division 1 and Division 2. They also have a team playing in the local Sunday League Second Division.

Llangeinor withdrew from the Welsh Football League Division Three in December 2011.

Board Members
 Chairman: Brendan McGrail
 Secretary : Angela Loosmore
 Treasurer : 
 Football Secretary : Paul Davies
 Assistant Football Secretary :

Records
 Record Attendance Approx 370 ( v Bettws 2007–08 )

Honours
 Bridgend & District League — Premier Division League Champions: 2017–18 - First Team
 Bridgend & District League — Division 2 League Cup Winners: 2016–17 - Second Team
 Bridgend & District League — Division One Champions: 2010–11- Second Team
 Bridgend & District League — Division One Runners-Up: 2004–05
 Bridgend & District League — Division One Runners-Up: 2000–01
 Bridgend & District League — Division One Champions: 1994–95
 Bridgend & District League — Division One Runners-Up: 1988–89
 Bridgend & District League — Division One Cup Runners-Up: 1987–88
 Bridgend & District League — Division One Cup Runners-Up: 1987–88
 Bridgend & District League — Division One Cup Winners: 1983-84

Junior Side - Llangeinor Rangers

Established in 2002, Llangeinor Rangers is a Junior Section which run teams from Under 7 to Under 16.
Many of the current squad of players have come through the Junior Section, with three players still playing from the original Rangers side that was developed in 2002, Anthony Bale, Gareth Taylor and Jack Taylor. See external links for more information on the junior section.

Other Teams
Llangeinor Football Club are represented by a number of teams in different sporting areas.
Currently at the Club, there are two Pool teams playing in the Garw Valley Pool League and one Pool team playing in the Ogmore Vale Summer Pool League.
Also representing the Club is a Darts team playing in the Aberkenfig Darts League.

External links
 Official Twitter
 Official Facebook
 Official League Website
  Official Sunday League Website
 Official Rangers Twitter
  Official Rangers Website
 All Wales Sport Website

References

Football clubs in Wales
Sport in Carmarthenshire
Welsh Football League clubs
South Wales Alliance League clubs
South Wales Amateur League clubs
Bridgend & District League clubs
Football clubs in Bridgend County Borough